"G Bedtime Stories" is a song by American rapper Snoop Dogg. It was released on February 6, 1999 as the first single of his fourth studio album No Limit Top Dogg, with the record label No Limit Records.

Music video 
The music video was directed by Gee Bee.

Track listing 
CD single
G Bedtime Stories (Radio Version) — 3:23
G Bedtime Stories (Instrumental) — 3:23

Personnel 
 Snoop Dogg - primary artist
 Meech Wells - producer
 Master P - executive producer

References

1999 singles
Snoop Dogg songs
Songs written by Snoop Dogg
1998 songs